Kamil Pestka (born 22 August 1998) is a Polish professional footballer who plays as a left-back for Cracovia.

International career
Pestka was called up to the senior Poland squad for the UEFA Nations League matches against Wales, Belgium, Netherlands and Belgium again, on 1, 8, 11 and 14 June 2022.

Honours

Club
Cracovia
Polish Cup: 2019–20

References

External links

1998 births
Living people
Polish footballers
Poland youth international footballers
Poland under-21 international footballers
Footballers from Kraków
Association football defenders
MKS Cracovia (football) players
Chrobry Głogów players
Ekstraklasa players
I liga players